Kili Airport is a public use airstrip on Kili Island, Marshall Islands. This airstrip is assigned the location identifier Q51 by the FAA and KIO by the IATA.

Facilities 
Kili Airport is at an elevation of 5 feet (2.5 m) above mean sea level. The runway is designated 04/22 with a coral gravel surface measuring 4,400 by 100 feet (1,341 x 30 m). There are no aircraft based at Kili.

Airlines and destinations

References

External links 
AirNav airport information for Q51

Airports in the Marshall Islands
Airport